Mickleys is an unincorporated community in Whitehall Township in Lehigh County, Pennsylvania. The village was named after the family of John Jacob Mickley (1697–1769), who settled here in 1745. It is located along Pennsylvania Route 145, also known as MacArthur Road. It is part of the Lehigh Valley, which has a population of 861,899 and is the 68th most populous metropolitan area in the U.S. as of the 2020 census. 

St. John's United Church of Christ, built in 1849, was originally known as the South Whitehall Church, commonly called Mickley's Church, and was a Union Church with both  Reformed and Lutheran congregations. Jacob Mickley (1794–1888), great-grandson of John Jacob, was an elder and on the building committee.

References

Unincorporated communities in Lehigh County, Pennsylvania
Unincorporated communities in Pennsylvania